St. Alban's Hall, also known as The Crenshaw Building, is a historic Masonic Lodge located in Richmond, Virginia, United States. It was built in 1869, and is a three-story, stuccoed brick Italianate style building.  The Hall consisted of shops, a concert hall, as well as Masonic meeting rooms, and served as an important focus of post-Civil War Richmond's social and political life.

It was listed on the National Register of Historic Places in 1982.  It is located in the Fifth and Main Downtown Historic District.

References

Former Masonic buildings in Virginia
Clubhouses on the National Register of Historic Places in Virginia
Italianate architecture in Virginia
Buildings and structures completed in 1869
Buildings and structures in Richmond, Virginia
National Register of Historic Places in Richmond, Virginia
Individually listed contributing properties to historic districts on the National Register in Virginia
1869 establishments in Virginia